Chisocheton medusae is a tree in the family Meliaceae. The specific epithet  refers to the mythological Medusa and alludes to the shape of the flower petals.

Description
The bark is black. The flowers are white.

Distribution and habitat
Chisocheton medusae is endemic to Borneo. The habitat is lowland rain forests from sea-level to  altitude.

References

medusae
Endemic flora of Borneo
Trees of Borneo
Plants described in 1937